Wendy Turnbull and Virginia Wade defeated Rosie Casals and Sharon Walsh-Pete in the final, 3–6, 6–3, 7–5.

Seeds

  Wendy Turnbull /  Virginia Wade (champions)
  Rosie Casals /  Sharon Walsh-Pete (final)
  Lesley Bowrey /  Judy Dalton (first round)
  Françoise Dürr /  Betty Stöve (semifinals)

Draw

Draw

External links
1992 Wimbledon Championships on WTAtennis.com

Women's Invitation Doubles